Lewis Carl Dunk (born 21 November 1991) is an English professional footballer who plays as a centre-back for  club Brighton & Hove Albion, which he captains.

Aside from a brief loan spell at Bristol City in 2013, Dunk has spent the entirety of his career at his hometown club Brighton, with whom he turned professional in 2010. In the 2016–17 season, Dunk achieved promotion to the Premier League with Brighton and was named in the Championship team of the year. He became the club's captain from the 2019–20 season.

Despite never being capped at youth level, although he was called up to the England U21 side in 2011, Dunk made his senior England debut on 15 November 2018 against the United States, which remains his only cap to date.

Club career

Brighton & Hove Albion

Early career

Dunk started his football career at Wimbledon until he was released following their liquidation and relocation to Milton Keynes, which they are known as Milton Keynes Dons. After leaving Wimbledon, Dunk joined Brighton & Hove Albion when he was playing for the U12 team. While progressing, Dunk went on trial at Crystal Palace and impressed the side that they offered him a contract but he rejected the move, citing "school commitment and couldn't travel three times a week up to London" and stayed at Brighton & Hove Albion at a good centre of excellence. He then signed a scholarship with the club. He was promoted to the club's U18 squad in November 2007.

On 30 April 2010, Dunk signed a two-year professional contract with Brighton & Hove Albion after impressive performances captaining the club's youth team. The following day, Dunk made his first professional appearance starting in the 0–0 draw at Milton Keynes Dons. After the match, he said: "It's fantastic, the best week of my life. We knew we were being told about pros and I was hopeful but I never thought I would be making my debut. I was told at the same time as I was told about my contract. Playing for my home town club is what I have always wanted to do so it's great. The others helped me along, talked to me all the time and just pulled me through." This turned out to be his only appearance of the 2009–10 season.

At the start of the 2010–11 season, Dunk suffered a foot injury that kept him out for four weeks. On 14 September 2010, he returned from injury and played 45 minutes, in a 0–0 draw against Wycombe Wanderers’ Reserves. Dunk made his first appearance of the season, starting the whole game, in a 1–1 draw against Tranmere Rovers on 2 October 2010. His performance against Woking in the FA Cup on 6 November 2010 received criticism, with Manager Gus Poyet saying: "In the first half he did quite well, then, because of the situation, he was one of the players who started to do things he doesn't do normally, changing the ball, going too long, playing with a little bit more risk." Dunk continued to fight for a starting place in the club's defence throughout the 2010–11 season. On 31 January 2011, Dunk signed a one-year extension on his contract keeping him at the club until the summer of 2013. Dunk made eight appearances in the 2010–11 season as Brighton gained promotion to the Championship as League One champions.

Ahead of the 2011–12 season, Dunk stated that he was aiming to fight for his place in the first team at Brighton & Hove Albion. With fellow defenders Tommy Elphick and Adam El-Abd sidelined by injury, Dunk started the 2011–12 season alongside captain Gordon Greer, playing in Brighton's first ever match at Falmer Stadium versus Doncaster Rovers, winning 2–1. During the match, he made a tackle on Billy Sharp which injured Sharp. Dunk apologised when the game was concluded. Dunk was involved as Brighton kept four clean sheets in the first four months of the season. Since the start of the 2011–12 season, he quickly established himself in the starting eleven for the side, appearing in the next two months before being sidelined for one match, due to suspension. After serving a one-match suspension, Dunk returned to the starting line–up against Hull City on 15 October 2011 and helped them keep a clean sheet, in a 0–0 draw. He then set up a goal for Greer to score the club's first goal of the game, in a 2–0 win against Barnsley on 6 November 2011. Dunk started in the next eight matches by the end of the year and along the way, helped Brighton & Hove Albion keep two consecutive clean sheets against Derby County and Nottingham Forest. This lasted until he served a one-match suspension. Dunk returned to the starting line–up against Bristol City on 14 January 2012 and set up the club's second goal of the game, in a 2–0 win. Throughout the January transfer window, he was linked a move away from the club, as Newcastle United, Cardiff City and Norwich City were interested in signing him, but Brighton managed to keep him. Despite being sidelined on three more occasions later in the season, Dunk went on to make 36 appearances in all competitions throughout the season, in Brighton's first season back in the Championship. Despite this, he was nominated for The Football League Young Player of the Year but lost out to Wilfried Zaha.

In the following season, Dunk's playing opportunities became more restricted; as he fell behind the likes of Adam El-Abd and Matthew Upson in the pecking order at Brighton. On 14 August 2012, he made his first appearance of the season, starting the whole game, in a 3–0 loss against Swindon Town in the first round of the League Cup. Following the absent of Greer and El-Abd, Dunk made his first league appearance of the season against Peterborough United on 6 November 2012 and helped them keep a clean sheet, winning 1–0. He then started in the next four matches before being sent–off against Crystal Palace on 1 December 2012, in the 8th minute for a foul on Yannick Bolasie, losing 3–0. After serving a one-match suspension, on 18 December 2012 Dunk returned to the starting line–up against Millwall, only to be substituted after playing 39 minutes, as they drew 2–2. Despite this, he featured 9 times in all competitions.

Dunk's struggles for regular game time continued into the start of the 2013–14 season. On 4 October 2013, Dunk joined League One club Bristol City on a one-month loan deal, to gain some first-team football. He made his debut for the club in a 2–1 away defeat to Wycombe Wanderers on 8 October 2013, in the EFL Trophy. Dunk suffered a knee injury and was substituted in the 40th minute, as Bristol City won 4–2 against Carlisle United on 26 October 2013. Upon the conclusion of his loan spell, he then returned from injury for the club's development team on 11 November 2013 against Ipswich Town's development team, winning 3–1. Two months later, on 4 January 2014 Dunk made his first appearance for Brighton & Hove Albion of the season, playing 23 minutes in a 1–0 win against Reading in the third round of the FA Cup. Dunk made 11 appearances for Brighton in all competitions, including a start in the club's the 4–1 play-off semi-final second-leg defeat to Derby County on 11 May 2014.

First team breakthrough
On 25 July 2014, Dunk signed a new four-year contract with Brighton, which kept him at the club until the end of the 2017–18 season. He scored his first goal for Brighton in the club's first match of the 2014–15 season, a 2–0 win over Cheltenham Town in the EFL Cup, which marked new boss Sami Hyypiä's first win at the club. Two weeks later, on 30 August 2014, Dunk scored a brace, in a 2–2 draw against Charlton Athletic. He then helped Brighton keep three consecutive clean sheets between 20 September 2014 and 27 September 2014. Dunk then added two more goals throughout October, scoring against Watford and Huddersfield Town. After serving a one-match suspension, he returned to the starting line–up, appointed as captain, in a 2–1 loss against Fulham on 29 November 2014. Dunk then captained the side for the next five matches for the rest of 2014. He again helped Brighton keep three consecutive clean sheets between 29 December 2014 and 10 January 2015, against Fulham, Brentford (where he scored) and Charlton Athletic. In another match against Brentford, Dunk was sent off for a second bookable offence, as they lost 1–0. Two weeks later, on 7 February 2015, he scored his seventh goal of the season, in a 3–2 loss against Nottingham Forest. After serving a two-match suspension, he again captained Brighton in three consecutive matches between 6 April 2015 and 14 April 2015. Dunk made his 100th appearance for the club, in a 2–0 loss against Watford on 25 April 2015. Throughout the 2014–15 season, Dunk quickly became a first team regular, playing in the centre–back position. In the 2014–15 season, Dunk made 44 appearances and scored seven goals, making him Brighton's top scorer in all competitions for the season.

Ahead of the 2015–16 season, Dunk continued to be linked a move away from Brighton, but the club stated that they would not be selling him. Amid the transfer speculation, he was fined by Brighton and was placed on the substitute bench throughout August. Eventually, Dunk ended the transfer speculation by signing a five–year contract, keeping him until 2020. He captained the side for the first time in the 2015–16 season, as Brighton lost 2–1 against Walsall in the second round of the League Cup. In the absence of Gordon Greer, he captained the club for the next five matches between 20 October 2015 and 7 November 2015. In an FA Cup third round match against Hull City on 9 January 2016, Dunk gave away a penalty, as they lost 1–0, and three days later he made a mistake that led to a second goal of the game, in a 2–0 defeat against Rotherham United. Manager Chris Hughton said: "As regards to Lewis, he has been excellent for us. Making any mistakes is part and parcel of the game."

Dunk retained his place in the first team for the side and was able to regain his form in the defence. He then helped to keep five consecutive clean sheets between 23 February 2016 and 15 March 2016 against Bristol City, Leeds United (in which, Dunk scored his first goal of the season), Preston North End, Sheffield Wednesday and Reading. He then scored two consecutive goals in two matches between 5 April 2016 and 11 April 2016 against Birmingham City and Nottingham Forest. He was sent off on two occasions throughout the 2015–16 season, both second bookable offence; the first one came on 15 December 2015 against Queens Park Rangers, drawing 1–1 and the second came on 2 May 2016 against Derby County for second bookable, drawing 2–2. The red card in the latter meant that he would miss the last game of the season, an away trip to Middlesbrough in winner-takes-all earning automatic promotion to the Premier League. Middlesbrough were ahead on goal difference and were promoted to the top flight after a 1–1 draw, with Brighton having to compete in the play-offs to fight for promotion. Dunk scored in Brighton's 1–1 play-off semi-final second-leg home draw against Sheffield Wednesday on 16 May 2016, however Brighton's 3–1 aggregate defeat condemned them to another season in the Championship. Despite this, he regained his first team place, playing in the centre–back position, throughout the 2015–16 season. At the end of the 2015–16 season, Dunk made forty–one appearances and scoring four times in all competitions.

Ahead of the 2016–17 season, Dunk was again linked with a move away from Brighton, with Crystal Palace and West Bromwich Albion reportedly interested in signing him. He started the 2016–17 season well by helping the club keep three consecutive clean sheets in the first three league matches of the season. On 6 September 2016, Dunk signed a five–year contract with Brighton, keeping him until 2021. He again helped Brighton keep four consecutive clean sheets between 13 September 2016 and 27 September 2016 against Huddersfield Town, Burton Albion, Barnsley and Ipswich Town. After serving a one-match suspension, he scored on his return to the starting line–up, in a 5–0 win against Norwich City on 29 October 2016. Following this, Dunk was nominated for October's Player of the Month but lost out to Sone Aluko.

On 2 January 2017, Dunk scored his second goal of the season, in a 2–1 win against Fulham. Shortly after serving a two-match suspension, he returned to the starting line–up as captain, helping the side win 2–1 against Sheffield Wednesday. After captaining for the second time, Dunk was sent off for second bookable offence, in a 3–1 loss against Huddersfield Town on 2 February 2017. After serving a one-match suspension, he returned to the starting line–up, in 4–1 win against Burton Albion on 11 February 2017. Two weeks later, on 25 February 2017, Dunk made his 150th appearance for the club, in a 3–0 win against Reading. He formed a partnership at centre-back with new Brighton signing Shane Duffy throughout the 2016–17 season. The club conceded a joint-league best of 40 goals for the season, in which Brighton were promoted to the Premier League. In this season, Dunk was also named in the PFA Championship Team of the Year alongside fellow Brighton players David Stockdale, Bruno and Anthony Knockaert. He also finished third place for the club's Player of the Year behind Stockdale and Knockaert.

Playing in the Premier League

Dunk played the full 90 minutes, and scored an own goal, in Brighton's first ever Premier League match, a 0–2 home defeat to Manchester City. Five days later, on 17 August 2017, he signed a five-year contract extension, keeping him until 2022. In the absence of Bruno, Dunk took over the captaincy. On 24 February 2018, Dunk scored his fourth own goal of the season in a 4–1 home win over Swansea City, which brought him level with Martin Škrtel at the top of the list of most own goals in a season in the Premier League. He scored his first Premier League goal in a 2–1 victory over Arsenal on 4 March 2018. Dunk played in every match in Brighton's debut season in the Premier League, as the club finished in 15th place and amassed 40 points. He finished second place for the club's Player of the Year behind Pascal Groß.

At the start of the 2018–19 season, Dunk suffered an ankle injury and was substituted in the 20th minute, as Brighton won 3–2 against Manchester United on 19 August 2018, resulting in him being sidelined for one match. On 1 September 2018, he returned to the starting line–up in a 2–2 draw against Fulham. Since returning to the first team from injury, Dunk retained his first team place for the side, partnering Shane Duffy in the centre–back position as well as resuming his captain duty in the absence of Bruno. On 5 October 2018, Dunk, alongside centre-back partner Duffy, signed a new contract with Brighton, with the pair signing five-year contracts that extended their stays at the club until June 2023. He then helped the side keep three consecutive clean sheets between 5 October 2018 and 27 October 2018 against West Ham United, Newcastle United and Wolves. Dunk's only goals in the 2018–19 season came in consecutive games in November 2018: a 3–1 loss to Everton and a 2–1 defeat to Cardiff City. He was sent off for a second bookable offence in a 2–0 loss against Bournemouth on 22 December 2018. After serving a one-match suspension, Dunk returned to the starting line–up against Everton on 29 December 2018 in a 1–0 win. On 17 March 2019, Dunk played the entirety of Brighton's 2–2 draw against Millwall in the FA Cup sixth-round. Dunk scored in the resulting penalty shoot-out, which Brighton won 5–4 to qualify for the FA Cup semi-finals for only the second time in the club's history. He also played in the subsequent semi-final, a 1–0 defeat to Manchester City. Since returning from suspension, he retained his first team place as well as his captaincy, for the rest of the 2018–19 season and helped Brighton finish 17th in the table as they secured their Premier League status. By the end of the 2018–19 season, Dunk had made 38 appearances, scoring twice in all competitions. He finished second place for the club's Player of the Year behind Duffy.

Ahead of the 2019–20 season, Dunk was given the Brighton captaincy by new head coach Graham Potter. He subsequently captained the club in their first match of the season, a 3–0 win over Watford, whilst also putting in a man of the match performance. Dunk scored in consecutive Premier League matches for Brighton in November 2019, finding the net in defeats to both Manchester United and Liverpool. In April 2020, he was in talks with the club over a temporary pay cut alongside Seagulls veteran Glenn Murray due to the impact of Covid 19, a move that Murray described as bringing the "club together even more." Dunk scored his third goal of the season, and was named man of the match, in Brighton's first game back following the Premier League's hiatus caused by the COVID-19 pandemic, a 2–1 win over Arsenal on 20 June 2020; Dunk equalised for Brighton before Neal Maupay scored the decisive goal. He made his 300th appearance for The Seagulls in a 3–0 home defeat against Manchester United on 30 June. Throughout the 2019–20 season, Dunk retained his first team place for the side, partnering Adam Webster in the centre–back position, as he helped the club survive relegation once again. Despite missing two matches during the 2019–20 season, Dunk made 36 appearances and scoring three times in all competitions. For his performance, Dunk won the club's Player of the Year Award.

After being linked with a move to Chelsea Dunk signed a new five-year contract with Brighton in August 2020. On 26 September, Dunk scored his fifth Premier League own goal, putting Manchester United back level in an eventual 3–2 home defeat. Dunk was sent off for the second time in his Premier League career and seventh Albion dismissal in the final moments of the game for a late, accidental, two-footed challenge on Gary Cahill in a 1–1 away draw against bitter rivals Crystal Palace on 18 October. Dunk scored his first goal of the 2020–21 season on 27 December, finishing off a short corner putting The Seagulls ahead in an eventual 2–2 away draw at West Ham. He scored again two games later, again converting another set piece from a corner, scoring the equaliser in a 3–3 home draw against Wolves in The Seagulls first match of 2021.  Dunk played in Brighton's 1–0 away victory over defending champions Liverpool on 3 February claiming their first league win at Anfield since 1982. Dunk made his 300th league appearance for The Seagulls on 6 February where he scored the opening goal of the game with a header from a corner in an eventual 1–1 away draw at Burnley. On 27 February, in a 1–0 away defeat at West Brom, Dunk had a goal controversially ruled out by referee Lee Mason after reviewing VAR with the free kick which the Seagulls captain scored from was deemed to be taken too quickly. After being denied the goal at West Brom, he scored his 10th Premier League goal two games later, scoring the first goal in an eventual 2–1 away win over Southampton, on 14 March, Brighton's first victory in the Premier League over their south coast rivals. On 9 May, Dunk scored the opening goal in an away fixture against Wolves, however he was later dismissed for pulling back Fábio Silva who was darting for goal with Wolves going on to capitalise on his dismissal scoring two, going on to win 2–1. Teammate Neal Maupay was later sent off after the full time whistle for confronting the referee, Jonathan Moss. He returned for Brighton's last game of the season away at Arsenal where they lost 2–0, ending the season in 16th place with a respectful –6 goal difference, conceding 46 goals. At Brighton's end of season awards, Dunk received the 2020–21 Players' Player of the Season, stating, "For your teammates to vote for you, I think it's the best award you can win."

On 6 November 2021, in Brighton's eleventh Premier League match of the 2021–22 season, Dunk had to play in goal for the final few minutes of the 1–1 home draw against Newcastle, after keeper Robert Sánchez was shown the red card after Albion had used all their substitutes. After being an ever present for The Seagulls in the league Dunk was sidelined for the away draw at Southampton on 4 December. It was later announced that Dunk had suffered a knee injury and would not feature again in 2021. He made his return to the matchday squad on 23 January 2022, remaining on the bench in the 1–1 away draw at Leicester. Dunk made his first appearance since his injury in a little over two months, playing the whole match of the 3–1 away loss in the FA Cup fourth round against Tottenham on 5 February. He made his first league appearance since 1 December on 12 February, helping Brighton secure the season league double over Watford with a 2–0 away win. In the next match, three days later, shortly after Cristiano Ronaldo's opener in the eventual 2–0 away loss at Manchester United, Dunk was sent off for the fourth time in his Premier League career. He was originally shown a yellow card by referee Peter Bankes, however, Bankes went to VAR and deemed Dunk to have denied Anthony Elanga a run on goal.  Dunk was only suspended for the one game, a 3–0 home loss against Burnley on 19 February, returning seven days later in another home loss, this time a 2–0 defeat against Aston Villa. He scored his first goal of the season a week later, heading home from a Pascal Groß corner, putting Brighton one behind, but failing to find an equaliser in the 2–1 away loss at Newcastle. On 7 May, Dunk helped Brighton to a clean sheet and their biggest ever top flight victory in the 4–0 home win over Manchester United. Captain Dunk helped Brighton to their highest ever top flight finish, finishing ninth after a 3–1 home victory over West Ham in the last game of the season.

On 7 August 2022, Dunk lead the Seagulls to their first ever win at Old Trafford in their opening game of the 2022–23 season after beating Manchester United 2–1, whilst also recording back to back victories over the Red Devils. In Brighton's fifth league match of the season, a 2–1 away loss at Fulham on 30 August, Dunk turned the ball into his own net, making it his sixth own goal in his Premier League career. He scored his first FA Cup goal since 2015 on 29 January 2023, scoring the equaliser in the eventual 2–1 home win over defending champions Liverpool to send Brighton to the fifth round. The win meant he had lead the Albion to a draw and two victories against the Reds in the 2022–23 campaign. Dunk made his 400th appearance for his hometown club on 28 February, in the 1–0 away win over Stoke City with Brighton going through to the FA Cup quarter-finals.

International career
Dunk is uncapped for England at youth level; his call-up to the England under-21 squad for their European Championship qualifiers against Iceland and Belgium in November 2011 marks his only youth international call-up.

In October 2018, he was called up for the first time to replace the injured James Tarkowski in the senior England squad for matches against Croatia and Spain in the Nations League. However, he did not make an appearance. In the next month Dunk was called up again for a friendly against United States and a Nations League match against Croatia. He made his debut on 15 November playing in the whole match in England's 3–0 win over the United States at Wembley Stadium. In doing so, he became the fourth Brighton player to earn a senior England cap, and the first since Steve Foster in 1982.

Personal life
Dunk was born in Brighton, East Sussex and educated at Varndean School. He is the son of former Sussex non-league player Mark Dunk. A Chelsea fan, Dunk idolised John Terry in his youth and named his family dog 'Didier' in homage to Chelsea forward Didier Drogba.

Dunk became engaged to his partner in summer 2019.

Career statistics

Club

International

Honours
Brighton & Hove Albion
Football League One: 2010–11
EFL Championship runner-up: 2016–17

Individual
PFA Team of the Year: 2016–17 Championship
Brighton & Hove Albion Players' Player of the Season: 2018–19, 2020–21
Brighton & Hove Albion Player of the Year: 2019–20

References

External links

Profile at the Brighton & Hove Albion F.C. website
Profile at the Football Association website

1991 births
Living people
Footballers from Brighton
English footballers
Association football defenders
Brighton & Hove Albion F.C. players
Bristol City F.C. players
English Football League players
Premier League players
England international footballers
Outfield association footballers who played in goal